Marián Šťastný (born January 8, 1953) is a Slovak former professional ice hockey right winger who played for five seasons in the National Hockey League from 1981 through 1986 for the Quebec Nordiques and Toronto Maple Leafs. Prior to moving to the NHL Šťastný had played in Czechoslovakia for Slovan ChZJD Bratislava with his brothers, Peter and Anton. They defected in 1980, joining the Nordiques, though Marián waited until 1981 to join them.

Playing career
Šťastný played for Slovan ChZJD Bratislava of the Czechoslovak First Ice Hockey League from 1974 to 1981. During this time, he represented Czechoslovakia in five World Championships (winning two gold medals), two Winter Olympics, and the 1976 Canada Cup. He also competed in the men's tournament at the 1980 Winter Olympics.

In 1981, Šťastný joined his two younger brothers, Peter and Anton, as free agents with Quebec Nordiques, playing with them for four seasons. They were the third trio of brothers to play on the same professional hockey team (the first being the Bentley brothers of the Chicago Blackhawks in the 1940s and the second being the Plager brothers of the St. Louis Blues in the 1970s). He was traded to the Toronto Maple Leafs before the beginning of the 1985–1986 season, playing one season in Toronto before ending his career in Switzerland with the HC Sierre.

Personal life
Šťastný was born in Bratislava, the third son of Stanislav and Frantiska. His two older brothers, Vladimir (born 1945) and Bohumil (born 1947) were born when the family still lived in the village of Pružina, about 170 kilometres northeast of Bratislava. They moved to Bratislava before Marián's birth, which was followed by Peter (1956), Anton (1959), and Eva (1966). Stanislav worked for a state-run company that built hydro-electric dams until 1980 when he retired, and mainly dealt with managing inventory. Frantiska stayed at home and raised the children. Vladimir was the former assistant coach of the Slovakia national ice hockey team. Marián's nephews Yan and Paul Stastny, both sons of Peter, have also played in the NHL.

Career statistics

Regular season and playoffs

CSSR totals do not include numbers from the 1970–71 season to the 1973–74 season.

International

See also 
Notable families in the NHL
List of Slovaks in the NHL

References

Bibliography

External links
 

1953 births
Living people
Czechoslovak defectors
Czechoslovak ice hockey right wingers
HC Dukla Jihlava players
HC Sierre players
HC Slovan Bratislava players
Ice hockey players at the 1980 Winter Olympics
National Hockey League All-Stars
Olympic ice hockey players of Czechoslovakia
Quebec Nordiques players
Slovak ice hockey right wingers
Ice hockey people from Bratislava
Toronto Maple Leafs players
Undrafted National Hockey League players
Czechoslovak expatriate sportspeople in Switzerland
Czechoslovak emigrants to Canada
Czechoslovak expatriate ice hockey people